John Lawrence Sullivan (June 16, 1899 – August 8, 1982) was an American lawyer who served in several positions in the US federal government, including as Secretary of the Navy, the first during the administration of Harry S. Truman.

Biography
Born in Manchester, New Hampshire, Sullivan was an alumnus of Dartmouth College. He graduated from Harvard Law School in 1924. Sullivan served as Assistant Secretary of the Treasury in 1940–44, Assistant Secretary of the Navy (AIR) in 1945–46, notable as the first civilian sworn into Naval office aboard a ship in an active combat zone, and as Under Secretary of the Navy in 1946–47.

Sullivan was appointed Secretary of the Navy upon James Forrestal's installation as Secretary of Defense. Sullivan's major contributions to the Navy's future directions include the advent of naval nuclear propulsion. In 1947, then-Captain Hyman G. Rickover went around his chain-of-command and directly to the Chief of Naval Operations, Fleet Admiral Chester W. Nimitz, by chance also a former submariner, to pitch his ideas for creating a nuclear-powered warship.  Nimitz immediately understood the potential of nuclear propulsion and recommended the project to Sullivan, whose endorsement to build the world's first nuclear-powered vessel, later caused Rickover to state that Sullivan was "the true father of the Nuclear Navy." In May 1949, Sullivan resigned in protest after the second Secretary of Defense, Louis A. Johnson, canceled the heavy aircraft carrier . This event was part of an interservice conflict known as the Revolt of the Admirals.

Sullivan and his wife had two daughters and a son. Sullivan died on August 8, 1982. He is buried in Arlington National Cemetery.

References

Further reading

External links

 Sullivan's Papers at the Harry S. Truman Library & Museum

1899 births
1982 deaths
United States Secretaries of the Navy
United States Under Secretaries of the Navy
Burials at Arlington National Cemetery
United States Assistant Secretaries of the Navy
Dartmouth College alumni
Harvard Law School alumni